Vidić (Cyrillic script: Видић) is a South Slavic surname, and may refer to:

Aleksa Vidić (born 1994), footballer
Andreja Vidić (born 1995), Montenegrin footballer
Dejan Vidić (born 1993), Serbian footballer 
Nebojša Vidić (born 1973), Serbian basketball player and coach
Nemanja Vidić (born 1981), retired Serbian footballer
Nemanja Vidić (born 1989), Serbian footballer
Velimir Vidić (born 1979), Bosnian footballer

Bosnian surnames
Serbian surnames
Slavic-language surnames
Patronymic surnames